Vahdat (formerly Kaerma) is a village in Sughd Region, northern Tajikistan. It is part of the jamoat Shahriston in Shahriston District.

References

Populated places in Sughd Region